The 2012 CNGvitall Prague Open, known also as 2012 CNGvitall Prague Open by Noncore for sponsorship reasons, was a professional tennis tournament played on clay courts. It was the 19th edition of the tournament which is part of the 2012 ATP Challenger Tour. It took place in Prague, Czech Republic between 7 and 13 May 2012.

ATP entrants

Seeds

 Rankings are as of April 30, 2012.

Other entrants
The following players received wildcards into the singles main draw:
  Jan Blecha
  Mate Pavić
  Jiří Veselý

The following players received entry as a special exempt into the singles main draw:
  Matteo Marrai
  Dušan Lojda

The following players received entry from the qualifying draw:
  Martin Fischer
  Miloslav Mečíř
  Dominik Meffert
  Kevin Krawietz

The following player received entry from a Lucky loser spot:
  Axel Michon

Champions

Men's singles

  Horacio Zeballos def.  Martin Kližan, 1–6, 6–4, 7–6(8–6).

Men's doubles

  Lukáš Rosol /  Horacio Zeballos def.  Martin Kližan /  Igor Zelenay, 7–5, 2–6, [12–10].

External links
Official Website
ITF Search
ATP official site

CNGvitall Prague Open
CNGvitall Prague Open
CNGvitall Prague Open
Clay court tennis tournaments
Tennis tournaments in the Czech Republic
2012
2012 in Czech tennis